The Five Satins are an American doo-wop group, best known for their 1956 million-selling song, "In the Still of the Night." They were formed in 1954 and continued performing until 1994. When it was formed, the group consisted of six members, which was eventually cut down to five. The group is in the Vocal Group Hall of Fame.

Career
The group, formed in New Haven, Connecticut, United States, in 1954, consisted of leader Fred Parris (March 26, 1936–January 13, 2022), Lewis Peeples, Stanley Dortche, Ed Martin, Jim Freeman, Nat Mosley. With little success, the group reorganized, with Dortche and Peeples leaving, and new member Al Denby entering. The group then recorded "In the Still of the Night", a big hit in the United States, which was originally released as the B-side to the single, "The Jones Girl". The single was initially issued on the tiny local "Standord" label (45 stock # 200) and after some local Connecticut sales, it was released the following year on the New York label Ember (45 stock # 1005), and "In The Still Of The Night" ended up charting at number three on the R&B chart and number 25 on the pop chart.

Two singles later, the follow-up track "Pretty Baby (That's Why I Sing)" (Ember 1025) got weeks of airplay on powerful CHUM in Toronto, in November 1957. An August 1958 release, "A Night To Remember" (Ember 1038), got some Boston airplay. During late 1959 (in San Francisco, California) and early 1960 (in both San Antonio, Texas and Rochester, New York), their classic 45 side garnered renewed current airplay, becoming a Top 10 hit in all three listed markets. "In The Still of the Night" became an even bigger hit when it appeared as the lead track on Original Sound Records' Oldies But Goodies Vol. 1. The series eventually ran to 15 volumes. The series has been in continual print in one form or another since that first volume was released in 1959. In total, their signature track sold over one million copies and was awarded a gold disc.

A case of painfully bad timing affected the group's lead singer. Parris entered the Army soon after the success of "In the Still of the Night", forcing the group to reorganize again, with Martin, Freeman, Tommy Killebrew, Jessie Murphy and new lead Bill Baker. Baker quickly proved to be a highly capable replacement, however, as this lineup immediately had success with Billy Dawn Smith's "To the Aisle" (Ember 1019), in September 1957.

Upon Parris' return from the Army, a new lineup was assembled, consisting of Parris, Lewis Peeples (who was in a previous incarnation of the Five Satins), Sylvester Hopkins, Richie Freeman and Wes Forbes. The group would be briefly known as "Fred Parris and the Scarlets", until the Baker-led group split up. At this point, they reverted to the Five Satins name. According to old radio survey repository ARSA, the following 45 sides charted in some markets: "I'll Be Seeing You" (Ember 1061); "Your Memory" (Cub 9071); "The Time" (Ember 1066); "These Foolish Things/A Beggar With A Dream" (Cub 9077); "Till The End" (United Artists 368); "The Masquerade Is Over" (Chancellor 1110); "Remember Me" (Warner Brothers 5367); and "Ain't Gonna Dance" (aka "Ain't Gonna Cry", Roulette 4563). In total, the group appeared on an unusually high number of record labels, even for their era.

In 1965, Parris retooled his band, and started a three-year run of getting substantial airplay almost exclusively inside his home state of Connecticut, as Fred Parris and the Restless Hearts. Songs included "No Use In Crying" (Checker 1108) "Blushing Bride/Giving My Love To You" (Green-Sea 106); "Bring It Home To Daddy" (Atco 6439); "I'll Be Hangin On" (Green-Sea 107); and ending this career phase with an updated version of their classic hit, "(I'll Remember) In The Still Of The Night "67" (Mama Sadie 1001).

By the early 1970s, the group was Parris, Peeples, Richie Freeman, Jimmy Curtis and Corky Rogers. "Dark At The Top Of My Heart" (RCA 0478) had garnered them still more Connecticut airplay. With the  1973 film American Graffiti and its nostalgic soundtrack sparking a renewed interest in both old hits and old groups, music mogul Don Kirshner sought to capitalize by signing Parris and his group to his own Kirshner label. He restored the group's moniker back to Five Satins, and released two 45s: "Very Precious Oldies/You Are Love" (Kirshner 4251), 1973; and "Two Different Worlds/Love Is Such A Beautiful Thing" (Kirshner 4252), 1974. Both singles flopped.

They continued recording into the 1980s, with Parris, Richie Freeman, Curtis and Nate Marshall. In 1982, a "Medley Craze" had suddenly engulfed Top 40 radio, led by the "Stars on 45" medley. Noticing this new trend, however, longtime Connecticut music producer Marty Markiewicz (who had known Parris personally for many years), who was working for Elektra Records at the time got an idea. He was given permission by his employer to bring Parris and company in to record/produce a medley of the 1950s hits.

The result was "Memories of Days Gone By" (Elektra 47411), which became the group's first new entry on the Billboard Hot 100 since 1960. In response to their successful medley, Elektra requested a full album. For this release, the "Five" was dropped, and the album was issued as by "Fred Parris and The Satins." Two more singles were released from it. The first, a remake of the Delfonics' 1970 hit "Didn't I (Blow Your Mind This Time)" (Elektra 69888), again got solid airplay in New Haven, in November 1982.

Meanwhile, Bill Baker had started his own Five Satins group around this same time, with former Satin Sylvester Hopkins and Hopkins' brothers Arthur "Count" Hopkins, Sr. and Frank. By the late 1980s, this group consisted of Baker, Harvey Potts, Jr., Anthony Hofler and Octavio DeLeon. In 1990, the group was joined by Jimmie Wilson stepping into the first tenor position for Don Simpson.

Awards and recognition
In 2003, the Five Satins were inducted into the Vocal Group Hall of Fame.

Present day

 James Curtis, one of the original members of the Five Satins, worked in the cafeteria at the University of New Haven prior to his death in 2001. Jim Freeman lives in Norwalk, Iowa and owns a pest control company. Wes Forbes is a psychologist in the State of California, currently employed with Alliant International University as a Training Director. Richie Freeman is the house sound engineer at NY's famed Iridium Jazz Club. Lewis Peeples, an original member of the group, began working as an International Representative at AFSCME in 1974, retiring as an International Union Area Director in 2007. He was a mediator and facilitator championing workers' rights while headquartered at various times in Washington, D.C.; New Orleans; and Atlanta.

Deaths
Bill Baker died on August 10, 1994.
Stanley Dortche died on October 2, 2010, at the age of 73. 
Lewis Edward Peeples died December 13, 2020, in Alpharetta, Georgia, at the age of 83. 
Fred Parris died January 13, 2022, at the age of 85.

Singles

 A"Memories of Days Gone By" Also Peaked at #32 on Adult Contemporary Singles.

References

External links
 "The Five Satins" Vocal Group Hall of Fame Page
 
 
  Entry for Fred Parris
 Bill Baker gravesite
 Tom Simon's article on The Five Satins
 Fred Parris Interview NAMM Oral History Library (2021)

American vocal groups
Cub Records artists
Doo-wop groups
Musical groups established in 1954
Musical quintets